Joaquim Cardoso Neto (born 27 June 1943), known as just Cardoso, is a Brazilian former footballer.

References

1943 births
Living people
Brazilian footballers
Association football midfielders
América Futebol Clube (SP) players
Pan American Games medalists in football
Pan American Games gold medalists for Brazil
Footballers at the 1963 Pan American Games
Medalists at the 1963 Pan American Games